The 2012–13 season of the Hessenliga was the fifth season of the league at tier five (V) of the German football league system.

League table

External links 
 Hessischer Fußball-Verband – official website of the Hessian Football Association 

Hessenliga seasons
Hessen